Ted Lone Wolf was a professional football player during the early years of the National Football League. He grew up and attended high school in his hometown of Flandreau, South Dakota. During his two-year career, Ted played in eleven games with the Oorang Indians. He played in seven games for the 1922 season and in four games for the 1923 season. Ted ended his professional career after the Indians disbanded in 1923.

References

What's an Oorang?
Ongoing Research Project Uniform Numbers of the NFL Pre-1933

20th-century Native Americans
Year of birth missing
Year of death missing
Native American players of American football
Oorang Indians players
People from Flandreau, South Dakota
Players of American football from South Dakota